Melanie Mariam Thanee Frasch (born December 1, 1971), better known as Melanie Peres is an Israeli model and actress. She has been a model for over 20 years, and has acted on various television programs and movies; she played the title role in the 2010 Israeli feature film Naomi.

Early life
Peres was born in Berlin, West Germany to a Christian father Peter, and Jewish mother Nurith Frasch. She was named after American singer Melanie Safka. After her parents separated when she was 3 years old, she stayed with her father. At 15, under difficult relationship circumstances where her father remarried, she left and immigrated to Israel to join her mother; she stayed at an absorption center in Upper Nazareth. Peres mentioned in interviews that the move was a traumatic experience. Although her mother was born in Israel, Peres was not accustomed to the differences in mentality, and did not speak a word of Hebrew at the time of her immigration. She had also enrolled in an ulpan to learn Hebrew while attending the local high school, but considered that useless.

Career

At 16, Peres quit school and moved from Nazareth to Tel Aviv, where she worked as a cleaner and a waitress until she began modeling in 1989. At 17, she appeared on the cover of the Israeli magazine La Ischa. She participated in the Israeli beauty contest "Face of the 80's." Although she did not win, she quickly became a rising star in the Israeli fashion world. The photographers loved her chameleon-like ability to change from assignment to assignment. Raz Yuvan of Haaretz remarked, "Over the years, she advanced from modeling bathing suits to the top of the industry." As a model, she traveled around the world, and worked in the industry for over 20 years. In a Haaretz interview, she said, "When I was young and people would ask me what I did, I used to answer: 'I work in the meat market.' I was embarrassed to make money from posing, and especially troubled by the fact that I lacked a proper education; but I had to work and couldn't support myself and study at the same time." Nevertheless, she acknowledged that modeling saved her life, since she had no financial support from her parents. She said, "I assume every profession has pluses and minuses. It enabled me to live and to live well - it gave me a good career, a lot of confidence in certain things, and it opened doors for me."

In 1998, Peres sang a duet with Yahli Sobol called "Hodaot" ("Messages"). In 2000, she made her acting debut with a lead role in the TV movie Abbaleh. She made several guest appearances on Israeli television in series such as Ha Burganim (The Bourgeoisie), and Tik Sagur (Case Closed).

In 2006, the Israeli fashion brand Honigman asked her to represent their firm. Peres modeled and presented for them for over six seasons, and designed an eponymous clothing line for their spring-summer collection. Honigman had planned to market her line in a method much like Kate Moss.

Peres participated in the album 30, which was written and produced by Sagi Tzoref and Elad Cohen. Her single '"Larutz Maher" ("Running Fast"), a duet with Yahli Sobol, ranked second Most Heard Song Of The Year in Israel, and its video, which was directed by Romi Abulafia and starred Neta Garty, won the Best Video Award. She also sang with Eviatar Banai and Assaf Amdursky. Viva Sarah Press of The Jerusalem Post considered "Larutz Maher" one of the most overplayed songs of the year.

Peres has also been involved in films. She cameoed as a UN volunteer in The Syrian Bride, and had the lead role in Beshamayim Aherim (Different Sky), the latter of which showed at the Haifa International Film Festival. On television, she had a guest appearance in Ha Chaverim Shel Naor (Naor's Friends). In Parashat Hashavua (Weekly Story), she played the role of Ronit Elkabetz's lover. She played one of the leading roles in the parody Telenovela Ba'am (Miniseries Ltd). In response to why she did not act earlier in her career, she said that she struggled with her confidence in pronunciation, and was afraid to speak in advertisements because of it: "I am still aware of my shortcomings and my ability to pronounce certain words is a bit problematic even today, but I've learned to live with it. That's beside the fact that I am a perfectionist and very anxious."

In 2008, Peres did a cover of the Tears for Fears song "Mad World", which was produced by Assaf Amdursky for the soundtrack of Reshef Levi's film Lost Islands. She was also voted Israel's Sexiest Woman.

In 2009, Peres teamed up with producer Oriana Givoli-Gniger, a former colleague in the modeling industry, on Tevat Noah (Noah's Ark), a TV series about group therapy, where she plays a lead opposite Mark Ivanir. Givoli-Gniger remarked, "When I read the role of Asia, I told Rani Blair immediately that it had to be Melanie, and I persisted. There is no greater joy than getting a good friend to do a significant role that fits her so perfectly."

In 2010, Peres starred as Naomi in Eitan Zur's film Hitparzut X (Naomi), written by bestselling author and theater director Edna Mazia. Naomi was selected in the Critics' Week category at the 67th Venice Film Festival in 2010.

Personal life
In 2007, Peres met actor Itay Tiran, who is eight years her junior. The couple married on October 31, 2008. They live in central Tel Aviv.

In a 2011 interview with Haaretz, Peres mentioned enjoying horses and life away from the modeling world, but is still open to acting gigs.

Discography 
 Hodaot ("Messages") with Yahli Sobol (1998) - single on Yahli's solo album Sus (Horse).
 Larutz Maher ("Running Fast") with Yahli Sobol (2006) - single on the Sagi Tzoref & Elad Cohen album 30.
 Mad World (2008) - cover of Tears for Fears song.

Filmography

Television

Film

References

External links 

 
 
 
 
 
 
 
 Melanie Peres at edb.co.il 
 Filmfund.org Melanie Peres An X-Ray Burst
 Melanie Peres at E-online 
 Melanie Peres at NRG.co.il 
  An X-Ray Burst Melanie Peres at Mouse.co.il 
 
 Assaf Amdursky Melanie Peres 
 Gabriel Baharalia Melanie Peres

1971 births
Israeli film actresses
Israeli television actresses
Living people
20th-century German Jews
German emigrants to Israel
German film actresses
German television actresses